Park Kyung-oan (born July 11, 1972 in Jeonju, Jeollabuk-do, South Korea) is a former South Korean baseball catcher and former Olympic bronze medalist. A four-time Golden Glove winner, Park is considered by many to be one of the best catchers in Korean baseball history. Playing for the Ssangbangwool Raiders, the Hyundai Unicorns, and the SK Wyverns during his career, his teams won five Korean Series championships.

Professional career 

Park started out his career as a member of the Ssangbangwool Raiders, playing for that team from 1991 to 1997, almost its entire existence. Park was then traded to the Hyundai Unicorns, where he played for the next five seasons. It was there, in the year 2000, where he had arguably the best season of his career, hitting .282 with 40 home runs, and winning the KBO League Most Valuable Player Award.

Park represented the Korean national baseball team in the 2009 World Baseball Classic, leading his team to second place.

In the 2010 season, Park became the first catcher in Korean baseball history to hit 300 career home runs. Park's 166 career hit-by-pitches are second-most in KBO history, after Choi Jeong.

Since 2013, Park has worked as the bench coach for the SK Wyverns.

See also 
 List of KBO career home run leaders

References

External links 
 
 Career statistics and player information from Korea Baseball Organization
 Profile from databaseolympics.com

1972 births
2009 World Baseball Classic players
Asian Games medalists in baseball
Baseball players at the 2000 Summer Olympics
Baseball players at the 2010 Asian Games
Hyundai Unicorns players
KBO League catchers
KBO League Most Valuable Player Award winners
Living people
Medalists at the 2000 Summer Olympics
Olympic baseball players of South Korea
Olympic bronze medalists for South Korea
Olympic medalists in baseball
People from Jeonju
SSG Landers players
South Korean baseball players
Ssangbangwool Raiders players
Asian Games gold medalists for South Korea
Medalists at the 2010 Asian Games
Sportspeople from North Jeolla Province